He Zhiwen (born January 31, 1962), or Zhiwen He in Western name order, is a Chinese-born Spanish male table tennis player. In 2006 he was ranked #41 in the ITTF world ranking. Due to the difficulty of pronouncing his name in Spanish he has been given the nickname Juanito.

He plays for Jura Morez TT club and his playing style is left handed short pips penholder. He represented Spain in the 2012 London Olympics where he lost to Romanian Adrian Crisan.

Sporting achievements 
1985: First position in the Championship of the World by team.
1991-2005: Champion of Spanish League.
1998: Twentieth position in the Championship of Europe by team.
1999: First position in mixed doubles and by team.
2000: Fifth position in the Championship of Europe in mixed doubles.
Ninth position the Championship of individual Europe in and double.
21st position in the Championship of the World by team.
2003: Seventeenth position in the World singles Championship.
2004: Thirtieth third position in the Olympic Games of Athens in singles.
2004: It occupies the sixtieth second position of the worldwide ranking.
2005: Ninth position in the Championship of Europe in doubles.
Sixty-sixth position in the Championship of Europe in mixed doubles.
Ninth position in the Championship of the World in singles.

See also 
 Chinese people in Spain
 Sport in China
 Sport in Spain

References

External links 
 Profile of He Zhiwen, Almeria tournament 2005

1962 births
Chinese emigrants to Spain
Living people
Spanish male table tennis players
Table tennis players at the 2004 Summer Olympics
Table tennis players at the 2008 Summer Olympics
Table tennis players at the 2012 Summer Olympics
Table tennis players at the 2016 Summer Olympics
Olympic table tennis players of Spain
Table tennis players from Zhejiang
Mediterranean Games bronze medalists for Spain
Competitors at the 2013 Mediterranean Games
People from Taizhou, Zhejiang
Naturalised table tennis players
World Table Tennis Championships medalists
Naturalised citizens of Spain
Mediterranean Games medalists in table tennis